Catton is a village in Northumberland, England.

External links

Northumberland Communities (accessed: 27 November 2008)

Villages in Northumberland